Rock Dream is a collaborative live album between Japanese band Boris and Japan noise musician Merzbow.

Production
Rock Dream was recorded live in November 2006 at Tokyo's Earthdom festival.

Style
Thom Jurek of AllMusic noted that the album was nothing like Sun Baked Snow Cave, a previous collaboration between Boris and Merzbow. Jurek noted that the music was not a "free-form improvisation and noise fest".

Release
Rock Dream was released on October 26, 2007, on the Japanese music label Diwphalanx Records.

The American label Southern Lord released the album in 2008 on compact disc and vinyl. The vinyl version includes the track "Dyno-Saur" that is not included on either version of CD releases. The American version had packaging designed by Stephen O'Malley, with their printer stating that they "never ever make anything like this again as it was painfully time-consuming and took forever to get just right!" This was a limited release with the label stating that there were "a little over 3800" manufactured in total.

Reception

The Austin Chronicle discussed the album in their overview of Boris' career, declaring it "definitive live document, an impossibly dense double album that touches down on nearly every point of their career, from Dronevil to Smile'''s contorted stairway to heaven ("Flower Sun Rain"), with Merzbow's electronic manipulations stitching it all together like connective scar tissue." In 2008, Raoul Hernandez of the Austin Chronicle placed Rock Dream on his list of top ten albums of 2007.

In a retrospective review from Tiny Mix Tapes, declared Rock Dream'' to be "not just the best album Boris ever made, but also one of the finest live albums I’ve ever heard." and that "It’s incredible then that someone recorded Boris and Merzbow that night, because for two hours they got to be the best band on the planet."

Track listing

CD version

LP version

Personnel
Merzbow with Boris
Takeshi – vocals, bass, guitar
Wata – vocals, guitar,  echo
Atsuo – drums, percussion, vocals
Masami Akita – EMS Synthi A, computer, hand made instruments, effects
Production
Yasuaki Satake – P.A engineer
Kazu – recording
Souichiro Nakamura at Peace Music – mixing, mastering
Fangsanalsatan – design [Diwphalanx]
Shizu – drawing [Diwphalanx]
SOMA – design [Southern Lord]
Thomas Hooper – drawing [Southern Lord]
Miki Matsushima – photo [Southern Lord]

References

External links
 

Collaborative albums
Boris (band) live albums
Merzbow live albums
2007 live albums
Southern Lord Records live albums